The Bugulmara were an indigenous Australian people of the state of Queensland.

Country
To their south were the Maikulan, with whom they shared strong ties.

History of contact
The Bugulmara were quickly dispossessed of their lands following the mining boom that took place when gold was discovered in the area.

Alternative names
 Boogoolmurra.
 Balgalu.(?)

Notes

Citations

Sources

Aboriginal peoples of Queensland